Arieh is both a given name and a surname. Arieh means lion in Hebrew. Notable people with the name include:

Given name
Arieh Batun-Kleinstub (born 1933), Israeli Olympic high jumper
Arieh Ben-Naim, professor of physical chemistry in the Hebrew University of Jerusalem 
Arieh Dulzin, Zionist activist who served as a Minister without Portfolio in Israel
Arieh Handler, Zionist leader
Arieh Iserles, computational mathematician 
Arieh Levavi, fourth Director General of the Israeli Israeli Ministry of Foreign Affairs
Arieh Lubin, Israeli artist
Arieh O'Sullivan author, journalist, and award-winning defense correspondent
Arieh Sharon, Israeli architect
Arieh Warshel, Israeli-American Distinguished Professor of Chemistry and Biochemistry and Nobel Prize winner

Surname

Josh Arieh, American professional poker player